Goon: Last of the Enforcers is a 2017 Canadian  sports comedy film directed by Jay Baruchel in his directorial debut and written by Baruchel and Jesse Chabot. A sequel to Goon (2011), the film stars Seann William Scott, Baruchel, Liev Schreiber, Alison Pill,  Elisha Cuthbert, Wyatt Russell, Marc-André Grondin and Kim Coates.

Principal photography began in Toronto on June 22, 2015. The film was released in Canada on March 17, 2017, and on September 1, 2017, in the United States.

Plot 
During an NHL lockout, Doug "The Thug" Glatt's (Seann William Scott) minor-league team, the Halifax Highlanders, receive media focus. Their owner, Hyrum Cain (Callum Keith Rennie), seeks to capitalize on the attention. For the opening game, Doug is made captain, but loses a fight with the rival team's enforcer, Anders Cain (Wyatt Russell), the son of the Highlanders' owner. Badly injured, Doug retires to a more stable job as an insurance salesman, while he and his pregnant wife Eva make preparations for their child. Without Doug, the Highlanders embark on a long losing streak which prompts the owner to push for changes. He signs several overseas players and his son.

Meanwhile, Doug finds no joy in his new job, and tries to find a way back into hockey. His old rival, Ross "The Boss" Rhea, convinces him to join him in a hockey fighting league, where he could find a way back into the game. He wins a ten-man battle royale, watched by Hyrum. Meanwhile, Anders does not perform well for the Highlanders, and eventually gets suspended for violence. Hyrum adds Doug back to the roster, as competition for his son. Before Doug's first game back, Eva makes him promise not to fight, for the sake of their future child. Doug reluctantly agrees, and the team goes on a winning streak, but when Anders returns from suspension, he goads Doug into being more aggressive. Doug and Anders interrupt a game during a dispute, and they are both suspended for the next game. During the game's afterparty, Anders provokes Doug into a fight, and when Eva sees that Doug has been fighting again, she kicks him out of the house.

Meanwhile, the Highlanders must win the last two games of the season to sneak into the playoffs. Hyrum signs Ross, at the expense of firing Anders. While Ross helps the Highlanders to win the first of their last two games, Eva goes into labor, and Doug reconciles with her as they head to the hospital. After having her baby, Eva realizes that the same drive that led Doug to be with her during the birth, is the same drive that pushes him to want to defend his teammates on the ice, and she gives Doug her blessing to continue fighting. Having been kicked off the team, Anders rejoins his old team, who will play the Highlanders in the last game of the season with a playoff spot on the line. Anders gravely injures Ross, and Doug enters the rink in retaliation.

Doug beats Anders, but when showing mercy at the end of the fight, Anders vengefully threatens Doug, claiming that he will never stop coming for him until they end up like Ross, being carried out on stretchers. Realizing that his new family is more important to him than hockey, Doug uses his weakened right arm to level Anders in the face just as he was about to strike again, throwing his arm out and being helped off the ice. Hyrum rushes to his son's aid, where Anders tells him that he hates hockey, and the two appear to mend things between them. Having been told earlier that further injury to his right arm would be career-ending, Doug realizes that his hockey days are behind him. He watches as the Highlanders win the game in the final seconds, and during the celebration, he sets his stick down and goes home.

In a post-credits scene, a female reporter talks about the Hockey Story. Doug doesn't know if he's a Gretzky and steals her microphone.

Cast 

Current and former hockey players Tyler Seguin, Michael Del Zotto, Brandon Prust, George Parros, Colton Orr and Georges Laraque make appearances in the film.

Doug "The Hammer" Smith, whom Doug Glatt is based on, has a cameo in the "Bruised and Battered" sequence. He is head-butted by Seann William Scott in the square-off between the two Dougs.

Production 
On September 24, 2012, it was announced that Jay Baruchel would be returning to write the sequel to Goon along with Jesse Chabot, while Michael Dowse was set to return to direct the film, and Evan Goldberg to produce. On May 15, 2015, it was announced that Baruchel would make his directorial debut on the film, titled Goon: Last of the Enforcers, and would also return in the role of Pat, while Seann William Scott would also return to play the role of the hockey enforcer, Doug "The Thug" Glatt. Goldberg would be executive producer, while David Gross, Jesse Shapira, Jeff Arkuss and Andre Rouleau would be producers on the film. On June 8, 2015 Elisha Cuthbert joined the cast of the film along with the returning cast of Liev Schreiber and Alison Pill from the first film.

On June 10, 2015, the complete cast of the film was announced by Entertainment One, Wyatt Russell was set to play Anders Cain, a volatile young captain of the Halifax Highlanders, Marc-André Grondin to play a superstar Xavier LaFlamme, Kim Coates as Highlanders coach Ronnie Hortense, Pill would star as Glatt's love interest Eva and Schreiber as Ross "The Boss" Rhea, while Cuthbert would play Mary, the outlandish sister of Pill's character Eva, who is now married to Doug the Thug. In a tweet on July 7, 2015 from the set of the film, TSN's Sportscaster James Duthie revealed that he and T.J. Miller were cast to play the sportscasters in the film. On July 23, 2015, real NHL players Tyler Seguin and Michael Del Zotto were spotted on the set during filming along with Scott.  On August 7, 2015, a tweet by Georges Laraque stated that he was headed to the set with Colton Orr and George Parros.

Filming 
Principal photography on the film began on June 22, 2015, in Toronto, Ontario. Baruchel also tweeted the photo of the cast from the set. Late-June, filming was taking place in Hamilton, Ontario's Corktown area, the Barrie Molson Centre in Barrie in July until August 13, 2015 and near Bayfront Park in Hamilton.

Reception
On review aggregator Rotten Tomatoes, the film has an approval rating of 42% based on 62 reviews, with an average rating of 5/10. The site's critical consensus reads, "Seann William Scott remains as watchable as ever in the title role, but Goon: Last of the Enforcers repeats its predecessor's violent and profane formula to diminishing effect." On Metacritic, which assigns a normalized rating to reviews, the film has a weighted average score of 48 out of 100, based on 17 critics, indicating "mixed or average reviews".

Barry Hertz from The Globe and Mail gave the film 3 out of 4 and wrote "Baruchel's sequel is everything Dowse's original film was, amped up a degree or three: The fights involving dim-bulb hero Doug (Seann William Scott) and his various rivals are bloodier, the locker-room talk is dirtier and the on-ice action is slicker. The unlikely project – how many made-in-Canada films spark a franchise? – doesn't quite reach the heights of the original film, which found surprising pathos in Doug's tale of sweet good guy to brutal goon. But it delivers on nearly every other scale, including standout performances from returning players Scott, Alison Pill and Liev Schreiber, as well as some bits of comic gold courtesy of series rookies Wyatt Russell, T.J. Miller and Jason Jones." Toronto Sun gave the film 3.5 out of 5, and stated "Violent, crude and really funny, Goon: Last of The Enforcers, works for the same reason the original Goon worked — you will love the characters." National Post gave the film a 1 out of 4.

References

External links 
 
 

2017 films
American sequel films
American sports comedy films
Canadian sports comedy films
Canadian sequel films
Canadian ice hockey films
English-language Canadian films
2010s sports comedy films
Films set in Nova Scotia
Films shot in Toronto
American pregnancy films
Vertigo Films films
2017 directorial debut films
2017 comedy films
2010s English-language films
2010s American films
2010s Canadian films